J. K. Gibson-Graham is a pen name shared by feminist economic geographers Julie Graham and Katherine Gibson. Their first book The End of Capitalism (As We Knew It) was published in 1996, followed by A Postcapitalist Politics in 2006. Julie Graham died on April 4, 2010 from complications from cancer. Katherine Gibson is currently professor at the Institute of Culture and Society, University of Western Sydney. The two scholars also founded The Community Economies Research Network (CERN) and the Community Economies Collective (CEC), "international collaborative networks of researchers who share an interest in theorizing, discussing, representing and ultimately enacting new visions of economy."

Work
Their current work involves rethinking economy and re-visioning economic development. They and the community economies collective draw on political economy, poststructuralism, feminism, and ongoing community-based research to pursue three major research directions:

Producing a language of the diverse economy that highlights the variety of transactions, forms of labor, class relations, types of enterprise, ecological relationships, and development dynamics in contemporary economies
Generating narratives, models and projects of non-capitalist and alternative capitalist development
Constructing and strengthening community economies in place through local action research.

Significance
J. K. Gibson-Graham have provided significant contributions to understandings of community economies and economic geography. In both A Postcapitalist Politics and The End of Capitalism (As We Knew It), Gibson-Graham "propose to construct a new 'language of economic diversity'" that will contribute to our understandings of possible economic structures. They use a Marxist analysis of capitalism but they argue that capitalism is overdetermined and that there are many non-capitalist economic practices that exist alongside it. Based on this insight, they elaborate a "politics of possibility" that explores alternatives to exploitative economic practices.  As one reviewer notes, Gibson-Graham "rejects the idea that capitalist economies are tightly organized systems" and instead presents the economy as consisting of "many different undertakings, only some of which cluster around market transactions."

In 1996, Gibson-Graham popularized and furthered discussion on a concept coined "capitalocentrism":
This term refers to the dominant representation of all economic activities in terms of their relationship to capitalism—as the same as, the opposite to, a complement of, or contained within capitalism. Our attempts to destabilize the hegemony of capitalocentrism have included a number of theoretical strategies:

1) production of different representations of economic identity, and

2) development of different narratives of economic development.

Their work focuses on moving beyond a "capitalocentric" viewpoint and recognizing the wide range of economic institutions that co-exist within a given social formation.

Publications

Books
 J. K. Gibson-Graham, 1996, The End of Capitalism (As We Knew It): A Feminist Critique of Political Economy, Oxford UK and Cambridge USA: Blackwell Publishers, 299pp.
 J. K. Gibson-Graham, S. Resnick and R. Wolff (eds), 2000, Class and Its Others, Minneapolis: University of Minnesota Press. 258pp.
 J. K. Gibson-Graham, S. Resnick and R. D. Wolff (eds), 2001, Re/presenting Class: Essays in Postmodern Marxism, Durham NC and London: Duke University Press. 319pp.
 J. K. Gibson-Graham, 2006, A Postcapitalist Politics, Minneapolis: University of Minnesota Press. 360pp
 Gibson-Graham, J. K., Cameron, J. & Healy, S., 2013, Take Back the Economy: An Ethical Guide for Transforming our Communities. Minneapolis: University of Minnesota Press.

Articles
J. K. Gibson-Graham. (1993) Waiting for the Revolution, or How to Smash Capitalism while Working at Home in Your Spare Time. in Rethinking Marxism 6(2) pp. 10–24. A shorter version was published in book Marxism in the Postmodern Age pp. 188–197
J. K. Gibson-Graham, (2011) “A feminist project of belonging for the Anthropocene” Gender, Place & Culture: A Journal of Feminist Geography. Vol. 18 Issue 1, p1-21.
J. K. Gibson-Graham (2004) “The Violence of Development: Two political imaginaries.” Development. Vol. 47 Issue 1, p27-34.

See also
 Community-based economics

References

External links
 Community Economies

Collective pseudonyms
Economic geographers
Women geographers
Pseudonymous women writers
21st-century pseudonymous writers
20th-century pseudonymous writers